Salcia is a commune in Șoldănești District, Moldova. It is composed of two villages, Lelina and Salcia.

References

Communes of Șoldănești District